Maatsuyker Island Lighthouse is a lighthouse on  Maatsuyker Island, Tasmania, Australia. It was the last Australian lighthouse still being officially operated by lightkeepers.  A second, smaller, and automated lighthouse was installed in 1996 but it is unclear whether volunteers are going to continue to work the lights on Maatsuyker Island.

Location 
The lighthouse is located near the south-west tip of Maatsuyker Island, probably because its main function originally would have been to warn ships approaching from the west and being blown in an easterly direction by the prevailing westerly winds of the Roaring Forties.  Many ships were shipwrecked on the south and west coasts of Tasmania from the earliest days of sail, until the advent of modern navigation aids, because of a combination of the westerly gales and the dangerous coastline.

History 
In 1891 the lighthouse was completed and until today it remains Australia's most southerly lighthouse. A first order Fresnel lens made by Chance Brothers was used in the lantern and is still operational. From the inauguration until the installation of the automated light, the lighthouse was staffed by volunteer lighthouse keepers, who constituted the total population of the island.

In August 2019, two volunteer lighthouse caretakers became engaged to be married at the lighthouse.

See also

 History of Tasmania
 List of lighthouses in Tasmania

References

External links

 Australian Maritime Safety Authority

Lighthouses completed in 1891
South West Tasmania
Lighthouses in Tasmania
1891 establishments in Australia
Tasmanian Heritage Register